HNLMS Medusa may refer to:
 , corvette, also known as Medusa, handed over to the Indonesian Navy in 1868
 , corvette with auxiliary steam power
 , minelayer

Royal Netherlands Navy ship names